Deedle-Dee Productions is an American television production company owned by Greg Daniels. It is known for producing the long-running series King of the Hill, The Office and Parks and Recreation.

Logo
The Deedle-Dee Productions logo is a blue screen with the company name written in fluorescent-colored letters (Occasionally the logo would be a black screen with the company name written in fluorescent-colored letters surrounded by similarly colored circles). These were drawn by Greg Daniels's daughter Haley.

Lists of shows
 King of the Hill (with Judgemental Films, 3 Arts Entertainment and 20th Television) (1997–2010)
 The Office (with Shine America and Universal Television) (2005–2013)
 Parks and Recreation (with Fremulon, 3 Arts Entertainment and Universal Television) (2009–2015)
 People of Earth (with Conaco and Warner Bros. Television) (2016–2018)
 Upload (with Amazon Studios) (2020–present)
 Space Force (with Film Flam and 3 Arts Entertainment) (2020–2022)

References

Mass media companies established in 1997
Television production companies of the United States
Adult animation studios